The Church of Jesus Christ of Latter-day Saints in West Virginia refers to the Church of Jesus Christ of Latter-day Saints (LDS Church) and its members in West Virginia. The official church membership as a percentage of general population was 0.92% in 2014. According to the 2014 Pew Forum on Religion & Public Life survey, roughly 2% of West Virginians self-identify themselves most closely with The Church of Jesus Christ of Latter-day Saints. The LDS Church is the 9th largest denomination in West Virginia.

History

Joseph Smith visited West Virginia in 1832 and that same year, two missionaries for the Church baptized 40 converts in the state.

In 1884, a congregation of 26 people was organized in the area.

On August 23, 1970, the first stake in West Virginia was organized in Charleston. Ezra Taft Benson, then an apostle of the church, presided at the organization of the stake.

Stakes
As of February 2023:

Stakes based in West Virginia
 Charleston West Virginia Stake 
 Clarksburg West Virginia Stake 
 Huntington West Virginia Stake 
 Martinsburg West Virginia Stake

Other stakes with congregations in West Virginia
 Buena Vista Virginia Stake
 Pembroke Virginia Stake 
 Pittsburgh Pennsylvania West Stake 
 Waynesboro Virginia Stake 
 Winchester Virginia Stake

Mission
 West Virginia Charleston Mission

Temples
West Virginia is divided among the Washington D.C. Temple, Louisville Kentucky Temple, and Columbus Ohio Temple districts.

See also

The Church of Jesus Christ of Latter-day Saints membership statistics (United States)
Religion in West Virginia

References

External links
 Newsroom (West Virginia)
 ComeUntoChrist.org Latter-day Saints Visitor site
 The Church of Jesus Christ of Latter-day Saints Official site

Christianity in West Virginia
Latter Day Saint movement in West Virginia
West Virginia